DaVinci Resolve is a color grading, color correction, visual effects, and audio post-production video editing application for macOS, Windows, and Linux, developed by Blackmagic Design. It was originally developed by da Vinci Systems as da Vinci Resolve until 2009, when da Vinci Systems was acquired by Blackmagic Design. In addition to the commercial version of the software (known as DaVinci Resolve Studio), Blackmagic Design also distributes a free edition, with reduced functionality, simply named DaVinci Resolve (formerly known as DaVinci Resolve Lite).

Development

Original da Vinci Systems development (2003–2009) 
The initial versions of DaVinci Resolve (known then as da Vinci Resolve) were resolution-independent software tools developed by da Vinci Systems (based in Coral Springs, Florida), who had previously produced other color correction systems such as da Vinci Classic (1985), da Vinci Renaissance (1990), and da Vinci 2K (1998). The system was first announced in 2003 and released in 2004. It began with three possible configurations: the Resolve DI digital intermediate color correction tool, the Resolve FX visual effects tool, and the Resolve RT 2K resolution processing tool. These initial versions were integrated exclusively into dedicated hardware controllers.

The systems leveraged parallel processing in an InfiniBand topology to support performance during color grading. This was initially implemented using proprietary hardware cards; however, the 4K resolution Resolve R series (such as the R-100, introduced in 2008, and the stereoscopic 3D R-360-3D, introduced in 2009) replaced this proprietary hardware with CUDA-based NVIDIA GPUs.

In 2009, Australian video processing and distribution technology company Blackmagic Design bought da Vinci Systems, retaining and expanding the engineering team for Resolve but eliminating support-based contracts for the tool. In October 2009, Blackmagic Design CEO Grant Petty speculated in an interview that the price of Resolve could likely be reduced to below $100,000.

Blackmagic Design versions (2010–present) 
At NAB 2010 in Las Vegas, in April 2010, Blackmagic Design announced three new pricing models for Resolve, with a new software-only macOS version retailing for $995, the macOS version with the Advanced Control Surface (previously branded as Impresario by da Vinci Systems) retailing for $29,995, and licenses for the Linux version (supporting multiple-GPUs for increased performance) retailing at $19,995 (with the most advanced configuration available retailing for under $150,000). Before this change, the pre-built versions of Resolve were the only available options, selling for between $200,000 and $800,000, which was common industry practice at the time. In September 2010, version 7 (restyled as DaVinci Resolve) was the first to be released by Blackmagic Design under the new pricing model, and the first release for macOS. It included a redesigned user interface, Apple ProRes support, and support for the RED Rocket digital video decoder boards manufactured by Red Digital Cinema.

The pricing model changes continued in June 2011 with the release of version 8: As part of this new version, Blackmagic Design announced a free, reduced-functionality edition of the software (known as DaVinci Resolve 8 Lite), alongside the continuing commercial options. Version 8 also introduced OpenCL acceleration support and XML integration with non-linear editor (NLE) applications. Subsequently, version 8.2 (December 2011) further expanded the software's scope (which was previously available only for macOS and Linux) with the first Windows release, beginning with a public beta.

Version 9 (2012) included redesigned user interface elements, added metadata editing options, and expanded the range of supported cameras and file types. The following year, version 10 was released, increasing the amount of information imported from XML, AAF and EDL files, and adding OpenFX plug-in, JPEG 2000 and AVI support. Version 10 was also the first to include basic video editing features alongside the color correction functionality, such as the trimming of clips.

Released in August 2014, version 11 added audio mixing, media organization features, and further video editing features, enabling the software to function as a standalone non-linear editor (NLE) for the first time, in addition to integrating with other NLEs.

Subsequently, version 12 (announced at NAB 2015) added a new audio engine (supporting VST/AU plug-ins), and version 14 (2017) added an integrated version of audio editing software previously developed by Fairlight (following Blackmagic Design's acquisition of the company during the same year).

The first version of Resolve for standard editions of Linux (version 12.5.5) was made available in 2017. It was also the first version in which a free Resolve version for Linux became available. Previous versions required a custom build of Linux, use of the DaVinci Resolve Advanced hardware control panel, and a license dongle.

Released in 2018, version 15 added an integrated version of the Fusion compositing and visual effects application, which was first developed in 1987 and was acquired by Blackmagic Design in 2014.

Blackmagic Design officially announced DaVinci Resolve version 16 at NAB 2019, in April 2019. New features included a dedicated 'Cut' page (a streamlined alternative to the 'Edit' page), machine learning functionality (Studio edition only) to handle repetitive tasks (e.g. facial recognition to sort clips by person), 3D audio within Fairlight, and new collaboration features (including Frame.io integration). Version 16.0 was made available on 8 August 2019.

The first details for DaVinci Resolve version 17 were announced on November 9, 2020, including improved Fairlight audio and HDR color correction tools. Version 17.0 final was officially released on February 25, 2021. Version 17.1 was released on March 10, 2021, and was the first Mac release to run natively on Apple silicon. Version 17.2 was released on May 12, 2021, and added AV1 hardware decoding support. Version 17.4 was released on October 22, 2021. Version 17.4.6 added AV1 hardware encoding support.

DaVinci Resolve 18 was officially announced on April 18, 2022, with introduction of real-time collaborative video editing, using Blackmagic Cloud devices as host servers; it was officially released on July 21, 2022. DaVinci Resolve 18.1, released on November 11, 2022, added Nvidia NVENC AV1 hardware encoding support.

On October 20, 2022, Blackmagic Design announced that DaVinci Resolve was also coming to iPadOS for the first time, stated that DaVinci Resolve for iPad would take advantage of 12.9-inch screen of the iPad Pro, and would be "a true professional editor that’s focused on introducing new innovations in speed". Unlike the desktop application, the iPad application provides only editing and color-related functionalities, while maintaining compatibility with DaVinci Resolve 18 project files and real-time collaboration via Blackmagic Cloud. DaVinci Resolve for iPad was released as a free app on Apple's App Store in December 2022, with the option to upgrade to DaVinci Resolve Studio via a $95 in-app purchase.

Functionality 
The software includes modules for video editing, color correction, audio mixing/effects (including Fairlight), and visual effects (including Fusion). It can either be used as an intermediary between other NLE software and Digital Cinema Package (DCP) creation software, or as a standalone end-to-end video editing application.

For content delivery to services such as Netflix, Resolve provides functionality to create and validate IMF (Interoperable Master Format, standardized by SMPTE) packages, known as IMPs (which comprise multiple components, such as MXF content, a composition playlist (CPL), and XML package data), without the use of separate DCP software.

Compatible file formats include video formats such as AVI, MP4, QuickTime, DNxHD, and XAVC; data exchange formats such as XML, EDL, AAF, DCP, MXF, and CinemaDNG; audio formats such as AAC, AIFF, and WAVE; and image formats such as RAW, OpenEXR, TIFF, DPX, R3D, JPEG, and JPEG 2000.

Supported plug-in types include OpenFX, VST, and AU.

As of version 12.2 (December 2015), Resolve supports the hybrid log–gamma (HLG) standard for a high dynamic range, as well as OpenCL and Intel Quick Sync Video.

Studio edition 
Unlike the free edition of the software, the commercial edition, DaVinci Resolve Studio, supports resolutions greater than ultra-high-definition and frame-rates over 60 FPS. It also includes support for multiple GPUs, additional OpenFX plug-ins such as Face Tracking and Lens Flare, stereoscopic grading, video noise reduction, motion blur, HDR color grading, and user collaboration tools.

It is also the only edition to include the machine learning functions introduced as part of Resolve version 16.

Fairlight integration 
Since version 14 (2017), DaVinci Resolve has included an integrated version of the software developed by Fairlight (now owned by Blackmagic Design) designed for TV & Film post-production, and live audio mixing. The Resolve-integrated software supports up to 1000 audio tracks, with a maximum of 6 inserts and 24 aux-sends per track. Other functionality includes 96-channel audio recording and 3D audio mixing for formats such as 5.1, 7.1 and 22.2. Integrated audio tools include compression/expansion, limiting, gating and parametric EQ.

Fairlight software has been used in the production of TV shows, advertisements, and feature films such as Logan and Murder on the Orient Express.

Fusion integration 

Since version 15 (2018), DaVinci Resolve also includes an integrated version of the Fusion application for compositing and visual effects, also developed by Blackmagic Design. Fusion's core functionality is based on a modular, node-based interface, with each node forming one specific aspect of the effects being implemented. The same interface style is used in the Resolve-integrated version.

Prior to its integration with Resolve, the standalone Fusion version was used to create effects for over 1,000 feature films and TV shows, including The Martian, Kingsman: The Secret Service and The Hunger Games: Mockingjay Part 2.

Mac App Store versions 
The free version of DaVinci Resolve and DaVinci Resolve Studio are available from the macOS App Store. However, some functionality, such as CUDA support, is not available in these versions due to restrictions imposed by Apple.

iPad version 
In December 2022, DaVinci Resolve for iPad was released. It is supported on iPads with an Apple A12 Bionic chip or newer running iPadOS 16 or later.

Related hardware 

Since introducing software-only options for Resolve, Blackmagic Design have also released hardware control panels that integrate with the software and provide users with a tactile interface and access to additional shortcuts. They include the DaVinci Resolve Micro Panel, the DaVinci Resolve Mini Panel (both released in 2017), and the DaVinci Resolve Advanced Panel (previously known as Impresario when manufactured by da Vinci Systems).

In addition to the full control panels, Blackmagic Design also announced the Editor Keyboard for Resolve in April 2019. It includes a standard computer keyboard and specialized components (such as a transport control for altering timeline position) to support two-handed editing. Before the release of the Editor Keyboard, the DaVinci Resolve Speed Editor, which integrates the advanced functionalities of the relatively new Cut page, was introduced.

Resolve also integrates with other hardware produced by Blackmagic Design, such as their Cintel film scanner.

In July 2018, Blackmagic Design released an external, portable graphics processing unit, the eGPU, developed in association with Apple to leverage the Metal API for professional video and graphics (such as those used by DaVinci Resolve).

Reception 
Davinci Resolve only had 100 users in 2009; however, since being acquired by Blackmagic Design, the software had a user base of more than 2 million using the free version alone as of January 2019. This is a comparable user base to Apple's Final Cut Pro X, which also had 2 million users as of April 2017.

In 2011, DaVinci Resolve received a Red Dot award for 'Motion Picture Colour Grading System'.

Version 14 received an additional Red Dot award in 2017 for 'User Interface Design, Post-Production Software', and in the same year, the software's newly released control panels, the Micro Panel and Mini Panel, also received Red Dot awards for 'Motion Picture Colour Grading System'.

Version 14 also received a 2018 Good Design Australia Award, as did the DaVinci Resolve Mini Panel.

In 2018, the Hollywood Professional Association (HPA) named DaVinci Resolve (version 15) as a recipient of their 2018 Engineering Excellence Awards.

Media produced using DaVinci Resolve

Film 
DaVinci Resolve has been used for the color grading and/or editing of feature films such as Alien: Covenant, Avatar, Best of Enemies, Deadpool 2, Jason Bourne, Kingsman: The Golden Circle, La La Land, Love & Mercy, Pirates of the Caribbean, Prometheus, Robin Hood, Spectre, Star Wars: The Last Jedi, and X-Men: Apocalypse.

DaVinci Resolve and Blackmagic Design hardware were used to create five of the eight 2019 Oscar nominated best picture films including Bohemian Rhapsody (most awards), The Favourite (most nominations), Roma (most nominations), Green Book (won Best Picture) and Vice. Additionally, DaVinci Resolve and Blackmagic Design hardware were used to create thirteen 2018 Oscar nominated films, nine 2017 Oscar nominated films, seven 2016 Oscar nominated films, four 2014 Oscar nominated films, and four 2010 Oscar nominated films (two for Best Picture).

20 films at the 2015 Sundance Film Festival leveraged DaVinci Resolve, followed by 35 in 2016, over 45 in 2017, over 55 in 2018, and over 35 in 2019. Presence of films created with Resolve at other film festivals includes the 2018 Austin Film Festival (over 25 films), the 2014 Cannes Film Festival (three films), the 2015 Cannes Film Festival (21 films), the 2019 Tribeca Film Festival, and the 2016 and 2017 South by Southwest festivals.

DaVinci Resolve has also been used in the restoration of classic films, such as Les Misérables, Spartacus, Black Like Me, Jamaica Inn, and The Perfect Woman.

Television 
DaVinci Resolve software has been used in television shows including 2 Broke Girls, American Horror Story, Arrow, Ash vs Evil Dead, The Big Bang Theory, Criminal Minds, Daredevil, The Flash, Gotham, How To Get Away With Murder, The Last Man on Earth, Lethal Weapon, The Man in the High Castle, The Mentalist, The Muppets, NCIS: Los Angeles, Orphan Black , Portlandia, Sons of Anarchy, Supernatural, The Walking Dead, and Westworld.

The software has also been used in the creation of television shows which have received Emmy Awards, such as Game of Thrones and Modern Family.

More than 55 of the 2018 fall television and streaming series relied on Blackmagic Design software and hardware, including DaVinci Resolve.

Other media 
DaVinci Resolve has also been used during the creation of other media, such as music videos, advertisements, concert production, and online media.

See also 

 Comparison of video editing software
 List of video editing software

References

Further reading 
 Scoppettuolo, Dion (2018-08-14). The Definitive Guide to DaVinci Resolve 15: Editing, Color, Audio, and Effects. Blackmagic Design. .
 Saccone, Paul (2017). The Definitive Guide to DaVinci Resolve 14. Blackmagic Design. .
 Saccone, Paul (2016-10-30). The Definitive Guide to Editing with Davinci Resolve 12. 5. Learning Paths. .
 Scoppettuolo, Dion (2016-05-12). DaVinci Resolve 12 - Blackmagic Design Authorized Training Series: Editing Fundamentals. Peachpit Press. .
 Zurli, Gian Guido (2015). DaVinci Resolve 11. Guida all'uso (in Italian). Edizioni LSWR. .
 Hullfish, Steve (2013-07-24). The Art and Technique of Digital Color Correction. Taylor & Francis. .
 Hurkman, Alexis Van (2013). Color Correction Handbook: Professional Techniques for Video and Cinema. Pearson Education. .

External links 
 

MacOS multimedia software
Video editing software
Video editing software for Windows
Windows multimedia software
2004 software
Video editing software for Linux
Software_that_uses_Qt
Graphics_software_that_uses_Qt